Pusiga is one of the constituencies represented in the Parliament of Ghana. It elects one Member of Parliament (MP) by the first past the post system of election. Pusiga is located in the Bawku Municipal District  of the Upper East Region of Ghana. 
Pusiga is part of the northern part of Ghana.

Boundaries
The seat is located within the Bawku Municipal District in the Upper East Region of Ghana.

History
This is one of the new constituencies created by the Electoral Commission of Ghana prior to the Ghanaian parliamentary and presidential elections in 2004.

Members of Parliament

Elections

See also
List of Ghana Parliament constituencies

References 

Parliamentary constituencies in the Upper East Region